Songo may refer to:

 Songo music, a type of contemporary Cuban music originating in Havana
 Songo people, of northern Angola
 Songo-salsa, a style of music that blends Spanish rapping and hip hop beats with salsa music and songo
 Songo.mn, an on-demand delivery service in Mongolia.

Places 

 Songo, Angola, a town and municipality in Uíge Province in Angola
 Songo, Mozambique, a town next to the Cahora Bassa lake in Tete Province in central Mozambique
 Songo, Burkina Faso, a town in the Zabré Department of Boulgou Province in south-eastern Burkina Faso
 Songo-Doubacore, a commune in the Cercle of Koutiala in the Sikasso Region of southern Mali
 Songo – La Maya, a municipality in Santiago de Cuba Province, Cuba
 Songo Mnara, a historic swahili settlement in Tanzania

See also
 Sango (disambiguation)